Kosovo competed at the 2022 European Athletics Championships in Munich, Germany, from 15–21 August 2018. A delegation of 2 athletes represented the country.

Results

The following athletes were selected to compete by the Kosovo Athletic Federation:

Men
Field events

Women
 Track and road

See also
Kosovo at the 2022 European Championships

References

Nations at the 2022 European Athletics Championships
2022
European Athletics Championships